The Minister of Foreign Affairs of Cameroon is a government minister in charge of the Ministry of Foreign Affairs of Cameroon, responsible for conducting foreign relations of the country.

The following is a list of foreign ministers of Cameroon since its founding in 1960:

References

Foreign
Foreign Ministers
Politicians
Foreign ministers of Cameroon
Foreign ministers